Elliott Washington Galkin (1921 - May 25, 1990) was an American music instructor, critic and conductor. He was the music critic of The Baltimore Sun from 1962 to 1977 and the director of the Peabody Institute from 1977 to 1982. He authored a book about orchestral conducting.

Early life
Galkin was born in 1921 in Brooklyn, New York City. One of his uncles was violinist Jascha Heifetz. Galkin graduated from Brooklyn College, earned a master's degree and PhD from Cornell University, and studied under Nadia Boulanger at the Conservatoire de Paris.

Career
Galkin began his career as a music instructor at Goucher College. He joined the Peabody Institute in Baltimore in 1957, and he served as its director from 1977 to 1982.

Galkin was the music critic of The Baltimore Sun from 1962 to 1977, and the president of the Music Critics Association from 1975 to 1977. He received the ASCAP-Deems Taylor Award for his criticism.

Galkin occasionally conducted the Baltimore Symphony Orchestra. He authored a book about conducting in 1988.

Death
Galkin died on May 25, 1990 in Baltimore, Maryland, at age 69.

Selected works

References

1921 births
1990 deaths
People from Brooklyn
Brooklyn College alumni
Cornell University alumni
Conservatoire de Paris alumni
Goucher College faculty and staff
Peabody Institute faculty
American music critics
American male conductors (music)
20th-century American conductors (music)
20th-century American male musicians
American expatriates in France